Daniel Sáez Gutiérrez (born 21 November 1996) is a Spanish motorcycle racer. He races in the RFME Superstock 600 Championship aboard a Yamaha YZF-R6.

Career statistics

Grand Prix motorcycle racing

By season

Races by year

External links
Profile on British Superbike Championship website

1996 births
Living people
Spanish motorcycle racers
Moto3 World Championship riders